837 Schwarzschilda, provisional designation 1916 AG,  is a low-eccentric, well-observed asteroid from the asteroid belt, orbiting the Sun with a period of 3.48 years at a distance of 2.21–2.39 AU. It was discovered by German astronomer Max Wolf at Heidelberg Observatory on 23 September 1916.

The main-belt asteroid was named after physicist and astronomer Karl Schwarzschild (1873–1916), who had died earlier that year. He was director of the observatories in Göttingen and Potsdam, known for his work in photometry, geometrical optics, stellar statistics and theoretical astrophysics, most notably for producing the first exact solutions to Einstein's field equations. At the time, it was custom to give feminized names to minor planets.

See also 
 Meanings of minor planet names: 501–1000
 Schwarzschild radius

References

External links 
 Dictionary of Minor Planet Names, Google books
 
 

000837
Discoveries by Max Wolf
Named minor planets
19160923